"Here and Now" is a song by South African rock band Seether. It is the fourth single from the band's fifth studio album Holding Onto Strings Better Left to Fray, from which the title of the album is taken. A deconstructed version is found on some bonus editions of the album, containing only an acoustic guitar, strings, and vocals.

Personnel
Shaun Morgan – lead vocals, rhythm guitar
Dale Stewart – bass, backing vocals
John Humphrey – drums
Troy McLawhorn – lead guitar
Brendan O'Brien – producer, mixer

Charts

Weekly charts

Year-end charts

Music video
The music video for "Here and Now" was released in December 2012. It showcased the band's last ten years, from when they first started to where they are now. It had references to many of their albums, songs, and tours, as well as showing clips from their previous music videos.

References

2012 singles
Seether songs
Rock ballads
Song recordings produced by Brendan O'Brien (record producer)
2010 songs
Wind-up Records singles
Songs written by Troy McLawhorn
Songs written by Shaun Morgan
Songs written by Dale Stewart
Songs written by John Humphrey (drummer)